Xuzhuang/Suning HQ station, also known simply as Xuzhuang station, is a station on Line 4 of the Nanjing Metro. It opened on January 18, 2017 alongside seventeen other stations as part of Line 4's first phase. The station is oriented on an east–west axis, underneath Suning Avenue and Donglai Street. The station is named after the nearby Xuzhuang Software Park and the headquarters of Suning Commerce Group, a Nanjing-based company. A mural inside the station's mezzanine level depicts the software and technology industry of the titular software park.

References

Railway stations in Jiangsu
Railway stations in China opened in 2017
Nanjing Metro stations